Quasipaa jiulongensis (Jiulong paa frog or Jiulong spiny frog) is a species of frog in the family Dicroglossidae.
It is endemic to eastern China and only known from the mountains of southwestern Zhejiang and adjacent Fujian above  elevation.
Its natural habitats are hill streams. It is threatened by habitat loss due to both logging and infrastructure development as well as by collection for food.

References

Quasipaa
Amphibians of China
Endemic fauna of China
Taxonomy articles created by Polbot
Amphibians described in 1985